is a 1958 Japanese film directed by Kon Ichikawa and adapted from the Yukio Mishima novel The Temple of the Golden Pavilion. Its English title is Conflagration.

Synopsis

Told in an intricate flashback structure, Enjō dramatizes the psychological collapse of Goichi (Raizo Ichikawa), a young Buddhist acolyte from a dysfunctional family who arrives at a Kyoto temple - the Golden Pavilion - for further study.

Goichi is haunted by two events - the discovery of his psychologically abusive mother's infidelity, and the effect of the revelation upon his father, who suddenly falls ill and dies shortly thereafter. Shy and idealistic - and hindered by a stuttering problem - Goichi arrives at the temple haunted by his dying father's sentiment that "the Golden Pavilion of the Shukaku Temple is the most beautiful thing in the world."

In the wake of entering into his studies, Goichi is visited by his now-widowed mother, who unexpectedly states her wish that he strive to succeed in his studies, so that he might one day become the head priest at the temple.  Under unexpected pressure from his irresponsible surviving parent, Goichi then must face a challenge to his own ideals upon discovery of the head priest's greed (the temple is being run as a tourist attraction, though an appearance of piety must be presented to outsiders) and his indiscreet pairings with a local geisha.

A flashback (one of many within the entire film's greater structure) to the funeral of Goichi's father introduces the idea of a cleansing inferno; with an escalating sense of desperation, Goichi sets fire to the pavilion. He is subsequently repudiated by his mother, and ultimately commits suicide before he can be taken to prison.

Cast
Ichikawa Raizō VIII as Goichi Mizoguchi
Tatsuya Nakadai as Togari
Nakamura Ganjirō II
Michiyo Aratama
Tamao Nakamura
Jun Hamamura
Ryosuke Kagawa
Tanie Kitabayashi as Goichi's mother

Production
 Yoshinobu Nishioka - Art director

Notes

References
 Mellen, Joan.  The Waves At Genji's Door: Japan Through Its Cinema, 1976.  Pantheon, New York.  
 Quandt, James.  Kon Ichikawa, 1982.  Cinematheque, New York.  
 Richie, Donald.  A Hundred Years of Japanese Cinema, 2001.  Kodansha America, New York & Tokyo.  
 Svensson, Arne.  Japan (Screen Series), 1971.  A.S. Barnes, New York.

External links

 
  Enjo at the Japanese Movie Database

1958 films
1958 drama films
Japanese drama films
1950s Japanese-language films
Japanese black-and-white films
Films based on Japanese novels
Films directed by Kon Ichikawa
Films based on works by Yukio Mishima
Daiei Film films
Films with screenplays by Natto Wada
Films with screenplays by Kon Ichikawa
Films produced by Masaichi Nagata
1950s Japanese films